Rhinophis saffragamus, the large shieldtail snake, is a species of  snake in the family Uropeltidae, which is endemic to the island of Sri Lanka. No subspecies are currently recognized.

Geographic range
It is found in Sri Lanka in central and southern Uva and Sabaragamuwa Provinces. Vertical range is from near sea level to 900 m elevation.

The type locality given is "Philippinschen Inseln": in error, according to M.A. Smith (1943).

Taxonomy
It is also mentioned in the synonymy of Ramphotyphlops, a genus of blind snakes, but then as a name proposed by Fitzinger in 1843. However, at the time this name was already preoccupied by Schlegel's Pseudo-typhlops (1839).

References

External links
 

saffragamus
Snakes of Asia
Reptiles of Sri Lanka
Endemic fauna of Sri Lanka
Reptiles described in 1853
Taxa named by Edward Frederick Kelaart